Losier Settlement was a settlement in New Brunswick.  There are 3 major highways that intersections with Losier Settlement, Route 11, Route 150, Route 160.  It is now part of the Regional Municipality of Grand Tracadie–Sheila.

History

Notable people

See also
List of communities in New Brunswick

References

Neighbourhoods in Grand Tracadie-Sheila
Former municipalities in New Brunswick